Mykolenko is a surname. Notable people with the surname include:

Mariya Mykolenko (born 1994), Ukrainian athlete
Vitaliy Mykolenko (born 1999), Ukrainian footballer

Ukrainian-language surnames